The Ichabod Leigh House is a historic Greek Revival style house constructed  and located at 953 Cherry Valley Road in the Mount Rose section of  Hopewell Township in Mercer County, New Jersey, United States. It was added to the National Register of Historic Places on March 4, 1975, for its significance in architecture.

History and description
The house is two and one-half stories high and features a cupola and a pediment with a lunette window. The  property also features extensive display gardens. The nomination form describes it as "the most sophisticated and refined Greek Revival domestic structure in Mercer County". It was built  for Ichabod S. Leigh of Somerset County. He sold the property in 1853. Subsequent owners include James Howell and Thomas B. Jackson.

See also
National Register of Historic Places listings in Mercer County, New Jersey

References

Hopewell Township, Mercer County, New Jersey
Greek Revival houses in New Jersey
National Register of Historic Places in Mercer County, New Jersey
Houses in Mercer County, New Jersey
Houses completed in 1835
1835 establishments in New Jersey
New Jersey Register of Historic Places